Daqiao Township is a township of Huize County in northeastern Yunnan province, China; it is situated about  north-northeast of the county seat,  southwest of Zhaotong, and  northwest of Qujing as the crow flies. , it has 14 villages under its administration. The township is located on the northeastern shore of the Yuejin Reservoir.

References 

Township-level divisions of Qujing
Huize County